Cha Kee Chin is a Malaysian politician who has served as the Member of Parliament (MP) for Rasah since May 2018. He served as Member of the Negeri Sembilan State Legislative Assembly (MLA) for Bukit Kepayang from March 2008 to May 2018. He is a member of the Democratic Action Party (DAP), a component party of the Pakatan Harapan (PH) opposition coalition.

Request for probe into distribution of food baskets
On 25 April 2020, Cha wrote a letter to then Prime Minister Muhyiddin Yassin to request him to order a probe into the distribution of food baskets to lower-income (B40, meaning Bawah 40%, the 40% bottom, describing the 40% people with lowest income) group affected by the COVID-19 pandemic to ensure transparency and prevent abuse. Cha questioned the costs of food baskets, which he claimed they only costed RM 35, in strong contradiction with the guidelines of the Ministry of Finance which outlined that they cost RM 100 and each MP would receive 1,000 baskets. Cha also shared that prior to writing Muhyiddin the letter, he had checked with the State Welfare Department of Negeri Sembilan on the remaining and unsent 850 food baskets and the department was unable to provide him a satisfactory reply.

Election results

References

External links 

Living people
1974 births
People from Negeri Sembilan
Malaysian politicians of Chinese descent
21st-century Malaysian lawyers

Democratic Action Party (Malaysia) politicians
Members of the Dewan Rakyat
Members of the Negeri Sembilan State Legislative Assembly
21st-century Malaysian politicians